Stephen Loosley AM FRSN (born 29 December 1952) is an Australian politician. He was a New South Wales Labor Senator from 1990 to 1995.

Career
Loosley served as National President of the ALP between 1991 and 1992, when he was pressured to resign amid controversy.

Loosley is an expert on American politics and is a regular commentator on US elections in Australian media outlets.

In 2018 he was elected a Fellow of the Royal Society of New South Wales.

References

1952 births
Living people
Members of the Australian Senate
Members of the Australian Senate for New South Wales
Australian Labor Party members of the Parliament of Australia
Members of the Order of Australia
People educated at Sydney Technical High School
20th-century Australian politicians
Australian Labor Party officials